Yual Reath (born 18 May 2000) is an Australian high jumper. A member of Australia's track and field team at the 2022 World Athletics Championships, he cleared a 2.25-metre mark as his personal best (2021). In 2022, he jumped in key competitions, winning the National title and placing second in the Oceania Championships, earning his place in the Australian team.

Competition record

References

External links
 

2000 births
Living people
Australian male high jumpers
Sportspeople from Ballarat
World Athletics Championships athletes for Australia
Australian Athletics Championships winners
Commonwealth Games competitors for Australia
21st-century Australian people